The 1958 Dan-Air Avro York crash was a fatal accident involving an Avro York cargo aircraft operated by Dan Air Services Limited on a non-scheduled international all-cargo service between Karachi, Pakistan, and New Delhi, India. The aircraft crashed on 25 May 1958 during a forced landing at Gurgaon, Haryana, India, after an engine had caught fire en route from Karachi to Delhi. Four of the five occupants of the aircraft were killed.

The aircraft
The aircraft, operated by Dan Air Services Ltd, was an Avro 685 York (registered in the United Kingdom as G-AMUV) that had its first flight in 1946. The York had been delivered to the Royal Air Force in February 1946, it was withdrawn from use and sold as a civilian aircraft in 1952.

Accident
Following the aircraft's departure from Karachi Airport in Pakistan's Sindh province, an in-flight fire developed en route to Delhi. This necessitated an immediate forced landing on rough terrain near Gurgaon in the Indian state of Haryana, resulting in the aircraft's break-up and a post-crash fire. Among the crew of five, the radio operator was the sole survivor. This crash was Dan-Air's first fatal accident.

Cause
The subsequent investigation established a mid-air fire as a consequence of an internal failure of the aircraft's no. 1 engine as the accident's probable cause.

References

Dan-Air
Aviation accidents and incidents in India
Airliner accidents and incidents caused by in-flight fires
Accidents and incidents involving the Avro York
Avro York crash
1958 in India
May 1958 events in Asia